Halon may refer to:

 Haloalkane, or halogenoalkane, a group of chemical compounds consisting of alkanes with linked halogens (in particular, bromine-containing haloalkanes)
 Halomethane fire extinguishing systems
 Various compounds that have been used in agriculture, dry cleaning, fire suppression, and other applications.
 Halon 10001 (iodomethane)
 Halon 1001 (bromomethane)
 Halon 1011 (bromochloromethane, CH2BrCl)
 Halon 104 (carbon tetrachloride)
 Halon 1103 (tribromofluoromethane)
 Halon 112 (dichlorofluoromethane)
 Halon 1201 (bromodifluoromethane)
 Halon 1202 (dibromodifluoromethane)
 Halon 1211 (bromochlorodifluoromethane, CF2ClBr)
 Halon 122 (dichlorodifluoromethane)
 Halon 1301 (bromotrifluoromethane, CBrF3)
 Halon 14 (tetrafluoromethane)
 Halon 242 (1,2-dichlorotetrafluoroethane)
 Halon 2402 (dibromotetrafluoroethane, C2Br2F4)—used as a fire extinguisher
 Halon 2600 (hexafluoroethane)
 Halon (software), a mail transfer agent (MTA) program

de:Halon
ru:Хладон